Abandonment is a term often used by mystic and ascetic writers to signify the first stage of the union of the soul with God by conforming to God's will, for example in the work of Jean Pierre de Caussade, Abandonment to Divine Providence:

"You do well to give yourself up entirely and almost solely to the excellent practice of an absolute abandonment to the will of God. In this lies for you all perfection."

Several recent Popes have referred to abandonment in their teachings. In 2011, Pope Benedict XV reflected that "prayer is not a reflection on one's self, but a complete abandonment to the word and will of God", and in 2013, Pope Francis spoke of Pope John XXIII's "daily abandonment to God's will" as "a lesson for all of us, and also for the Church of our time".

References

Visionary literature